U.S. Route 84 (US 84) is a part of the U.S. Highway System that travels from Pagosa Springs, CO to Midway, GA. In New Mexico it begins at the Colorado state line northwest of Chama and ends at the Texas state line in Texico.

Route description
Therefore, only  of US 84 is located west of the Continental Divide. At a T-intersection, New Mexico State Road 17 enters from the north and terminates at said intersection, while US 64/US 84 enter from the south and west.

About  down the road, US 84 is joined by US 285 south of the small community of Chili. About  further, US 84/US 285 enter the city of Española from the north as North Paseo de Onate Street. At the south end of the town, US 84/US 285 becomes the Santa Fe Highway and a four-lane expressway. And about  further, US 84/US 285 becomes a limited-access freeway.  further south, the two return to surface street status and then travel past downtown Santa Fe via St. Francis Drive. On the south side of Santa Fe at Interstate 25's exit 282A, US 84/US 285 merge with northbound I-25/US 85. All four highways head east and slightly to the south to avoid the Sangre de Cristo Mountains. Just before turning north, US 285 exits the freeway at exit 290 and continues south towards Clines Corners. After winding north and south, the freeway finally begins heading solely north, and US 84 exits about  later at exit 339 near Romeroville and travels in an east/southeastern direction, while I-25/US 85 continue north to Colorado. After  I-40/US 84 enter Santa Rosa. About  from its concurrency with I-40, US 84 diverges at exit 277.

The highway then travels south/southeast for  until merging with US 60 in downtown Fort Sumner. From the intersection with US 60, US 60/US 84 travel east, passing through Taiban and Melrose before intersecting US 70 after  in Clovis. From the intersection with US 70, US 64/US 70/US 84 travels east  entering Texico. Here, about  before the Texas–New Mexico state line, US 60 splits from US 70/US 84 with US 70/US 84 continuing east into Farwell, Texas.  Despite being a west-east route, US-84 is signed as north-south between Fort Sumner and the Colorado border.

History
US 84 was first extended west into New Mexico in 1936 at Texico. In 1937, the route was extended further to Santa Fe, and in 1938, the route was extended further to Cortez, Colorado. However, this extension did not last long, because the highway was truncated back to Santa Fe. The current route for US 84 was created in 1941.

Major intersections

References

84
 New Mexico
Transportation in Rio Arriba County, New Mexico
Transportation in Santa Fe County, New Mexico
Transportation in San Miguel County, New Mexico
Transportation in Guadalupe County, New Mexico
Transportation in De Baca County, New Mexico
Transportation in Roosevelt County, New Mexico
Transportation in Curry County, New Mexico